Chicoreus insularum is a species of sea snail, a marine gastropod mollusk in the family Muricidae, the murex snails or rock snails.
Chicoreus insularum is a species of predatory sea snail in the family Muricidae, commonly known as the island murex or the spiked murex. It is found in the tropical waters of the Indo-Pacific region, including the Philippines, Indonesia, and the Great Barrier Reef in Australia. The shell of Chicoreus insularum is thick and heavy, with pointed spines along the edges and a spiral pattern of ridges on the surface. It is highly prized by shell collectors and is also used in traditional medicine in some cultures. In the wild, Chicoreus insularum feeds on other mollusks and can be found in a variety of marine habitats, including rocky reefs and sandy bottoms.

Description

Distribution

References

Muricidae
Gastropods described in 1921